Planjava is the highest mountain of the eastern Kamnik Alps in northern Slovenia.

History of climbing 
The first recorded climb was by Franz Hohenwart in 1793 with a local from Kamniška Bistrica, although it is speculated that there were local hunters who climbed the mountain before them. Planjava is now one of the most visited peaks in Slovenia.

Routes 
 2 hrs from the Kamnik Saddle Lodge
 1½ hrs from the Kocbek Lodge at Korošica
 2½ hrs from the Kocbek Lodge at Korošica above Lučka Baba
 5¼ hrs from the Klemenšek Cave Lodge at Ojstrica

Climbing routes

Southeastern wall 
 Memorial route Štefana Kukovca (VI/V)
 Route Humar - Škarja (V-/IV)
 Route Sobotna smer (V+/IV+)

Western wall 
 Route Steber Planjave - smer X (IV)
 Route Svetelova (IV/III)
 Route Smer skozi rov in okno (IV/III-II)
 Route Kratkohlača (V-/IV)

Northern wall 
 Route Gradišnik - Ogrin (V-/IV)
 Route Dular - Juvan v Glavi (VII)

References

External links 
 Planjava on hribi.net Route Description and Photos (slo)
 Planjava on summitpost.org

Mountains of the Kamnik–Savinja Alps
Mountains of Styria (Slovenia)
Two-thousanders of Slovenia